The Blanche Barkly was a gold nugget found in Kingower, Victoria, named for the daughter of the governor of the colony at the time. Weighing 1743 oz (49.4 kg), it was discovered on August 27, 1857 at a depth of 13 feet (3.96 m) by Samuel & Charles Napier and Robert & James Ambrose. It was, at the time, the largest gold nugget ever discovered and remains the third-largest discovered. The nugget measured 2'4" (71 cm) long, 10" (25 cm) wide and varied from 1" to 2" (2.5 – 5 cm) in thickness and was valued at between £8,000 and £10,000 at the time of its discovery.

References

Gold nuggets
Australian gold rushes
Mining in Victoria (Australia)
History of Victoria (Australia)
History of Australia (1851–1900)
1857 in Australia